Amsacta bicoloria is a moth of the family Erebidae. It was described by Max Gaede in 1916. It is found in Ghana, Cameroon and Nigeria.

References

Moths described in 1916
Spilosomina
Insects of Cameroon
Insects of West Africa
Moths of Africa